MV Suilven was a vehicle ferry built in 1974 and operated for 21 years by Caledonian MacBrayne on the Ullapool to Stornoway route. She subsequently operated in New Zealand and later in Fiji.

History
Suilven was the second of twins, intended for Oslofjord and named after the mountain peak Suilven in Sutherland . She was  bought off the stocks in 1974 and modified to comply with British standards for the Lewis service. She remained on the route until 1995, when she was replaced by the larger .

Design
The car deck featured two lanes either side of the central casing and featured two hoistable mezzanine decks for additional car capacity. Car deck access was via a two piece bow ramp and visor, with a single piece stern ramp. The superstructure featured a foremast above the wheel house carrying the radar scanners and aerials, and a main mast aft incorporated into the forward edge of the funnel, cleverly concealing the main engine exhausts. Her original single lounge bar saloon was soon divided with a screen to cordon off different areas. The cafeteria and servery was situated aft of the saloon and in common with vessels of the time, she was fitted out with a number of sleeping berths allowing passengers to embark the night before an early departure.

Early in her Caledonian MacBrayne career, she was fitted with stabilisers, improving stability. Suilven was the first vessel in the Caledonian MacBrayne fleet to carry the fleet branding on the hull side in large steel letters, welded to the hull side. Air conditioning was fitted for her service in Fiji.

Service
Suilven was purchased for the Stornoway to Ullapool route, a replacement for the 1964 . She operated the route for  21 years,  giving two crossings per day in summer reducing, until 1979, to one in winter. In October 1989, 's larger passenger capacity was required for those travelling to the Mòd in Stornoway. For those 10 days, Suilven took over the Oban-Craignure service.

By the 1990s, she was increasingly inadequate for the traffic on the service and unacceptably slow and the larger MV Isle of Lewis was built, offering superior capacity and facilities, entering service in July 1995.

No longer required in Scotland, she was sold to Strait Shipping, for service between the North Island and South Island of New Zealand. In 2004, she was moved to Fiji and operated between Suva, Savusavu (on Vanua Levu) and Taveuni.

In August 2012, Suilven was advertised for sale and expected to be sold as scrap for demolition; however, in late 2012, it was reported that Ben Naidu, owner of Venu Shipping, had acquired the ship for refitting and further service in Fiji, for an undisclosed sum. It was believed that, for the first time in her history, the ship would be renamed.

On 24 November 2015 Suilven capsized in Suva harbour. There were no passengers aboard as the ship was only carrying cargo at the time of the incident, the crew were rescued, no one injured.

References

External links

1974 ships
Ships built in Moss, Norway
Ferries of the United Kingdom
Caledonian MacBrayne
Cook Strait ferries
Merchant ships of Fiji
Maritime incidents in 2015
Shipwrecks in the Pacific Ocean